The Maine Supreme Judicial Court is the highest court in the state of Maine's judicial system. It is composed of seven justices, who are appointed by the Governor and confirmed by the Maine Senate. Between 1820 and 1839, justices served lifetime appointments with a mandatory retirement age of 70. Starting in 1839, justices have been appointed for seven-year terms, with no limit on the number of terms that they may serve nor a mandatory retirement age.

Known as the Law Court when sitting as an appellate court, the Supreme Court's other functions include hearing appeals of sentences longer than one year of incarceration, overseeing admission to the bar and the conduct of its members, and promulgating rules for all the state's courts.

The Maine Supreme Judicial Court is one of the few state supreme courts in the United States authorized to issue advisory opinions, which it does upon request by the governor or legislature, as set out in the Maine Constitution.

It is also unusual for a state's highest appellate court in that its primary location is not that of the state's capital city, Augusta, partially because the Kennebec County Courthouse did not have a courtroom large enough for the Supreme Court's proceedings. The court did meet there from 1830 until 1970, when it permanently moved to the Cumberland County Courthouse. The renovation of the Kennebec County Courthouse in 2015, which included expansion of the bench in its largest courtroom to permit all seven justices to sit there at the same time, has allowed the court to meet there at least twice a year.  It will also continue to meet in Portland, Bangor, and at high schools around the state.  The new York Judicial Center in Biddeford, scheduled to be completed in early 2023, will also contain a courtroom large enough to permit the court to sit there.

The MSJC is also authorized to rule on the fitness of the Governor of Maine to serve in office, which it does upon the Maine Secretary of State certifying to the court that the governor is temporarily unable to carry out the duties of that office.  The court must then hold a hearing and, if it agrees that the governor is unfit, declare the office of governor temporarily vacant and transfer its duties to the President of the Maine Senate, who would serve as acting governor. If the Secretary of State later certifies to the Supreme Court that the governor is fit to resume office, the court would then decide whether it agrees.

Current justices

There are three active retired justices.

See also
 Courts of Maine

References

External links 
 
 Maine Supreme Judicial Court Opinions
 

 
State supreme courts of the United States
Maine state courts
1820 establishments in Maine
Courts and tribunals established in 1820